Ludwig Haberlandt (1 February 1885 – 22 July 1932) is known as a father of hormonal contraception. In 1921 he carried out experiments on rabbits and he demonstrated a temporary hormonal contraception in a female by transplanting ovaries from a second, pregnant, animal.

His father was the eminent botanist, Gottlieb Haberlandt, plant tissue culture theorist and visionary; his grandfather was the European 'soybean' pioneer and trailblazer Friedrich J. Haberlandt.

In 1930 he began clinical trials after successful production of a hormonal preparation, Infecundin®, by the G. Richter Company in Budapest, Hungary. He ended his 1931 book, Die hormonale Sterilisierung des weiblichen Organismus, with a visionary claim: 'Unquestionably, practical application of the temporary hormonal sterilization in women would markedly contribute to the ideal in human society already enunciated a generation earlier by Sigmund Freud (1898). Theoretically, one of the greatest triumphs of mankind would be the elevation of procreation into a voluntary and deliberate act.' He was hounded for his views on reproductive biology up to his death from either suicide, or heart attack.

References
 
 
 
 

Austrian scientists
1885 births
1932 suicides
Suicides in Austria
Hormonal contraception